Allen Township is one of fourteen townships in Miami County, Indiana, United States. As of the 2010 census, its population was 695 and it contained 267 housing units.

History
Allen Township was organized in 1859.

Geography

Cities, towns, villages
 Macy

Unincorporated towns
 Birmingham at 
(This list is based on USGS data and may include former settlements.)

Extinct towns
 Wagoner at 
(These towns are listed as "historical" by the USGS.)

Cemeteries
The township contains these two cemeteries: Five Corners and Plainview.

Major highways
  U.S. Route 31

Landmarks
 5 Corners Cemetery
 Plainview Cemetery

School districts
 North Miami Community Schools

Political districts
 Indiana's 5th congressional district
 State House District 23
 State Senate District 18

References
 
 United States Census Bureau 2008 TIGER/Line Shapefiles
 IndianaMap

External links
 Indiana Township Association
 United Township Association of Indiana
 City-Data.com page for Allen Township

Townships in Miami County, Indiana
Townships in Indiana